Vulcan Planum  is the unofficial name given to a large plain on the surface of Pluto's moon Charon, discovered by New Horizons during its flyby of Pluto in July 2015. It is named after the fictional planet Vulcan in the science-fiction series Star Trek. The name is not approved by International Astronomical Union, .

Geography
Vulcan Planum is in the southern hemisphere of Charon. Its extents are not completely known, but it occupies at least . Vulcan Planum is separated from Oz Terra by a series of scarps that are several kilometers high. It has a mostly smooth surface with no large craters, and its elevation is about 1 km lower than Oz Terra's. This suggests that Vulcan Planum is younger than Oz, and formed as a result of a large cryoflow, which has solidified.

The more significant craters have been named after characters from Star Trek, while two mountains have been named after science-fiction authors and directors.

List of named geological features

The features included this table lie within Vulcan Planum.

References

Surface features of Charon
Star Trek